is a town located in Niigata Prefecture, Japan. , the town had an estimated population of 9,349 in 3480 households, and a population density of 54.2 persons per km².

Geography
Tsunan is located in southwestern Niigata Prefecture, in a mountainous area bordering northern Nagano Prefecture. The town is located on a river terrace of the Shinano River with the town hall at an elevation of 241 meters; however, much of the town area is mountainous, with Mount Naeba (2143 meters) is partly located within the town limits. Due to its geographical location between the Sea of Japan and the surrounding Japanese Alps, it has one of the highest annual snowfalls in Japan. There are numerous ski resorts within the region.

Surrounding municipalities
Niigata Prefecture
Tōkamachi
Yuzawa
Nagano Prefecture
Sakae

Climate 
Tsunan has a Humid subtropical climate with continental influences (Köppen Cfa/Dfa) characterized by hot, wet summers and cold winters with heavy snowfall.

Demographics
Per Japanese census data, the population of Tsunan has declined steadily over the past 70 years and is now considerably less than it was a century ago.

History
The area of present-day Tsunan was part of ancient Echigo Province and was tenryō territory under the direct control of the Tokugawa shogunate in the Edo period. Following the Meiji restoration, the area was organised into various villages within Nakauonuma District, Niigata The town of Tsunan was established on January 1, 1955 by the merger of the villages of Tomaru, Kamigō, Ashigasaki, Akinari, Nakafukami and Shimofunato.

Government

Tsunan has a mayor-council form of government with a directly elected mayor and a unicameral city council of 14 members. Tsunan, together with the city of Tōkamachi, collectively contributes two member to the Niigata Prefectural Assembly. In terms of national politics, the town is part of Niigata 6th district of the lower house of the Diet of Japan.

Economy
The local economy is dominated by agriculture. The area is known for its rice, sake, tomatoes, sunflowers, and buckwheat noodles. The town is also within commuting distance of neighbouring Tōkamachi.

Education
Tsunan has three public elementary schools and one public middle school operated by the town government. There is one public high school operated by the Niigata Prefecture Board of Education.

Transportation

Railway
 JR East -  Iiyama Line
 -  -  -

Highway

Local attractions
Ryu-ga-kubo, one of the 100 Famous Springs of Japan
Nishiotaki Dam
Echigo-Tsumari Art Triennial
Okinohara Site, Jomon period ruins, a National Historic Site

References

External links

Official Website 

Towns in Niigata Prefecture
Tsunan, Niigata